is a Japanese former volleyball player who competed in the 1964 Summer Olympics.  He was born in Hiroshima Prefecture.  In 1964 he was part of the Japanese team which won the bronze medal in the Olympic tournament. He played three matches.

External links
 profile

1941 births
Living people
Japanese men's volleyball players
Olympic volleyball players of Japan
Volleyball players at the 1964 Summer Olympics
Olympic bronze medalists for Japan
Olympic medalists in volleyball
Medalists at the 1964 Summer Olympics
20th-century Japanese people